Frank Stubbs may refer to:
 Frank Stubbs (Australian footballer) (1919–1997), Australian rules footballer
 Frank Stubbs (footballer, born 1878) (1878–1944), English footballer
 Frank Stubbs (ice hockey) (1909–1993), American ice hockey player
 Frank Edward Stubbs (1888–1915), Victoria Cross recipient
 Frank Stubbs (American football), college football player
 Frank Stubbs Promotes, British television programme starring Timothy Spall